Clarington (2021 population 101,427) is a lower-tier municipality in the Regional Municipality of Durham in Ontario, Canada. It was incorporated in 1973 as the town of Newcastle with the merging of the town of Bowmanville, the Village of Newcastle and the townships of Clarke and Darlington, and was established on January 1 1974. In 1993, the town was renamed Clarington, a portmanteau of the names of the two former townships. Darlington today is largely suburban, while Clarke remains largely rural. Bowmanville is the largest community in the municipality and is the home of the municipal offices.

Clarington is part of the Oshawa census metropolitan area in the eastern end of the Greater Toronto Area (GTA). Major employers in Clarington include the Darlington Nuclear Generating Station, General Motors Canada, and several medium to large-sized manufacturing businesses. Most residents commute for work in Durham Region or Toronto.

Local government
Clarington is governed by an elected municipal council consisting of a mayor, and local councillors representing each of the municipality's four wards. In addition, two regional councillors each represent a pair of wards. The mayor and the regional councillors sit on both Clarington Council and Durham Region Council.

The current council was elected on October 24, 2022.

Demographics 

Ethnicity 

Note: Totals greater than 100% due to multiple origin responses.

Language 
2011 Census data show that Clarington has one of the highest proportions of residents that have English as their mother tongue within the GTA (91.2%). French is the native language for 1.8% of the population of Clarington. No other language has more than 1% of native speakers (Dutch with 0.8% - 695 native speakers - tops the pack of immigrant languages).

Climate
Environment Canada operates a weather station in Bowmanville. Under the Köppen climate classification Bowmanville has a humid continental climate with warm summers and cold winters. Unlike many other locations on similar latitudes on the eastern half of the North American continent the winters are relatively mild, with cold extremes being moderated by the proximity to Lake Ontario. Summers are normally moderately warm with averages of around  during the day but with nights cooling off rapidly to fall below  on many occasions.

Communities

The municipality of Clarington consists of several urban communities, including Bowmanville, Courtice, Newcastle and Orono; as well as several rural communities such as Bond Head, Brownsville, Burketon, Clarke, Crooked Creek, Enfield, Enniskillen, Gaud Corners, Hampton, Haydon, Kendal, Kirby, Leskard, Lovekin, Maple Grove, Mitchell Corners, New Park, Newtonville, Port Darlington, Port Granby, Salem, Solina, Starkville, Taunton (east portion; west portion split with Oshawa along Townline Road), Tyrone, West Side Beach and Wilmot Creek.

Infrastructure

Transportation
Clarington is home to several highways; three of which are 400 series highways. Highway 401 stretches through the entirety of Clarington, connecting Newtonville, Newcastle, Bowmanville, and Courtice along the route. Highway 407 is located in north Clarington. It was extended to and terminates at Highway 35/115. The 35/115, also in Clarington, begins at Highway 401 in Newcastle, and heads north to Peterborough. Highway 418, begins at Highway 401 and heads north to connect to Highway 407. The 418 opened on December 9, 2019, as a toll highway. These tolls were removed on April 5, 2022, by the Ontario government. Highway 2, once the primary east–west route across the southern portion of Ontario, runs through Clarington. Downtown Newcastle and Bowmanville are situated along Highway 2.

Bus services are offered by Durham Region Transit and GO Transit.

Freight rail is carried along the Canadian National Kingston subdivision and Canadian Pacific Belleville subdivision which pass through Clarington. The wooden bridge on Lakeshore Road in Lovekin, Ontario that traverses the CN train line is a popular destination for rail photographers.

On June 20, 2016, it was announced that the Lakeshore East GO Transit line would be extended to Bowmanville. Clarington gained two new stations. Darlington GO Station, in Courtice and the terminus; Bowmanville GO Station. As of the announcement, the stations are scheduled to open in 2024.

Power

Clarington is home to the Darlington Nuclear Generating Station.

The Durham-York Energy Centre is located in Clarington. It is home to a 20 MW energy-from-waste (EFW) generation unit that opened in early 2016 that takes waste (140,000 tonnes per year) from Durham and York Regions to burn to generate electricity.

Co-developed by Durham and York Region cost $295 million Canadian to build was built and operated by American-based Covanta. The unit sells and transmits electricity onto Hydro One's distribution network.

Clarington was a candidate location to host ITER in 2001, but the bid was withdrawn two years later.

Attractions
Clarington is home to five Christmas parades. It has more Santa Claus/Christmas parades than any other town-sized municipality in Canada . The parades are run in: Bowmanville, Newcastle, Courtice, Orono, and Enniskillen/Tyrone. The latter parade is organized by "T.H.E.E. Farmer's Parade of Lights", which is a special Christmas parade put on by the farmers from the communities of Tyrone, Haydon, Enniskillen and Enfield.

Enniskillen, which is located in the northern part of Clarington, was the birthplace of Samuel McLaughlin. Mr. McLaughlin started the McLaughlin Motor Car Co. in 1904 and was one of the first major automobile manufacturers in Canada, which evolved into General Motors of Canada. Enniskillen is home to the Enniskillen General Store which opened in 1840 and stills operates today.

Clarington is home to Jungle Cat World.

Clarington Museums & Archives is the local museum in the municipality.

Clarington is home to Camp 30, a World War II Prisoner-of-war camp, and located on Lambs Road, in Bowmanville.

Clarington is also home to Brimacombe, a ski resort located near Kirby, Ontario.

Clarington is home to Darlington Provincial Park, which is located in Darlington.

Bowmanville Zoo
Clarington was home to the Bowmanville Zoo, until its closure in 2016. The Clarington Family Outdoor Adventure Park occupied the same property as the former Bowmanville Zoo lands for several years under the same ownership, until closure. As of 2022, the Township is working with volunteers at Valley 2000 to convert the Zoo grounds into a town park, with trails connection the surrounding housing areas.

Canadian Tire Motorsport Park

A major attraction in the municipality is the Canadian Tire Motorsport Park (formerly Mosport Park), a multi-track facility located north of Bowmanville that features a 2.459-mile (4.0 km), 10-turn road course; a half-mile paved oval; a 2.4 km advanced driver and race driver training facility and a 1.4 km kart track (Mosport International Karting). It was also a host of the Canadian Grand Prix of Formula One before the event was moved to a circuit in Montreal in the 1970s.

Canadian Tire Motorsport Park (CTMP) was also the location of three major music festivals held between 1970 and 1980. The Strawberry Fields Festival held August 7–9, 1970 featured Alice Cooper, Jethro Tull, Grand Funk Railroad, Procol Harum, Ten Years After, Lighthouse, Crowbar and Sly and the Family Stone. John Lennon was to be the headline act, bidding to gain exposure for his peace campaign, but after months of planning he backed out due to differences with the show's promoter. However, the event still used the title of The Beatles' 1967 single of the same name. Led Zeppelin were booked to play but also backed out.

Canada Jam was held August 26, 1978 and the Heatwave Festival was held August 23, 1980.

CTMP was home to Republic Live's Boots and Hearts Music Festival, which first opened in the summer of 2012. In 2015, the event was abruptly moved to Burl's Creek Event Grounds, near Barrie.

Notable residents
 Ken Davies, ice hockey player
 Samuel McLaughlin, businessman and philanthropist

See also
List of townships in Ontario

Notes

References

External links

 
Lower-tier municipalities in Ontario
Populated places on Lake Ontario in Canada